Ingå railway station was a railway station in the municipality of Ingå, Finland, between the stations of Siuntio and Karis. The station was designed by architect Bruno Granholm. 

Because of very low number of passengers, the station was closed on 27 March 2016.

Connections

See also 
 Railway lines in Finland

References

External links 

Ingå
Railway stations in Uusimaa
Railway stations designed by Bruno Granholm
Railway stations opened in 1903
Railway stations closed in 2016
Defunct railway stations in Finland